Membranous aplasia cutis is a cutaneous condition, a type of aplasia cutis congenita, which can be seen along the embryonic fusion lines of the face.

See also 
 List of cutaneous conditions

References 

Cutaneous congenital anomalies